Cameo Kirby is a 1914 American drama silent film directed by Oscar Apfel and written by Clara Beranger and William C. deMille. The film stars Dustin Farnum, Fred Montague, James Neill, Jode Mullally, Winifred Kingston and Dick La Reno. It is based on the play Cameo Kirby by Booth Tarkington and Harry Leon Wilson. The film was released on December 24, 1914, by Paramount Pictures.

Plot
In New Orleans, Gene Kirby, nicknamed Cameo, finds himself financially ruined after his father's death and must auction off the plantation with all the slaves. After the sale, Cameo goes with Randall, an old friend of the family, on a boat that goes up the river hosting a gambling hall. On board, Cameo wins against Colonel Moreau, a professional player; at the same time, Randall, involved in the game, loses all his properties. Unaware that Cameo wants to return his losses, Randall kills himself. Randall's son Tom swears revenge and, when Moreau is killed in a duel against Cameo, he steals the weapon from the dead man's hand, making the duel look like murder. Cameo escapes capture but manages to convince Tom's sister, Adele, of whom Cameo is in love, of his innocence. When the gun is found in Tom's possession, the Randall family recognizes Cameo's innocence, restoring his honor: Cameo, a true southern gentleman, can be entrusted with the fate of the beautiful Adele, making him enter their family.

Cast 
Dustin Farnum as Cameo Kirby
Fred Montague as Colonel Moreau
James Neill as John Randall
Jode Mullally as Tom Randall
Winifred Kingston as Adele Randall
Dick La Reno as Larkin Bunce
Ernest Joy as Aaron Randall

See also
 Cameo Kirby (1923)
 Cameo Kirby (1930)

References

External links 
 

1914 films
1910s English-language films
Silent American drama films
1914 drama films
Paramount Pictures films
American black-and-white films
Films based on works by Booth Tarkington
American silent feature films
Films directed by Oscar Apfel
1910s American films